As of the 2020 United States census, Arizona had a population of 7,151,502. 

A past census found that the population had seen a natural increase since the last census of 297,928 people (that is 564,062 births minus 266,134 deaths) and an increase due to net migration of 745,944 people into the state. Immigration from outside the United States resulted in a net increase of 204,661 people, and migration within the country produced a net increase of 541,283 people. New population figures for the year ending July 1, 2006, indicate that Arizona is the fastest growing state in the United States, with 3.6% population growth since 2005, exceeding the growth of the previous leader, Nevada. The most recent population estimates released by the US Census put the population at 7,278,717 in 2019.

The population density of the state is 45.2 people per square mile. In 2010, there were an estimated 460,000 undocumented immigrants in the state. These constituted an estimated 7.9% of the population.

The center of population of Arizona is located in Maricopa County, which contains over 61% of Arizona's population.

Ancestry

2020 census
According to the 2020 census, the racial make up of Arizona was 53.4% Non-Hispanic White, 4.7% African American, 4.5% Native American, 3.6% Asian, .2% Pacific Islander. The State was 30.7% Hispanic or Latino.

According to the 2005–2007 American Community Survey conducted by the U.S. Census Bureau, White Americans made up 76.4% of Arizona's population; of which 59.6% were Non-Hispanic Whites. Black people or African Americans made up 3.4% of Arizona's population; of which 3.3% were non-Hispanic black people. American Indians made up 4.5% of the state's population; of which 4.1% were non-Hispanic. Asian Americans made up 2.3% of the state's population. Pacific Islander Americans made up 0.1% of the state's population. Individuals from some other race made up 10.8% of the state's population; of which 0.2% were non-Hispanic. Individuals from two or more races made up 2.4% of the state's population; of which 1.4% were non-Hispanic. In addition, Hispanics and Latinos made up 29.0% of Arizona's population.

The state has the third-highest number (and the sixth-highest percentage) of Native Americans of any state in the Union. 286,680 were estimated to live in Arizona, representing more than 10% of the country's total Native American population of 2,752,158. Only California and Oklahoma have more Native Americans. The perimeters of Phoenix, Tucson, Prescott, Flagstaff and Yuma border on Native American reservations.

The largest ancestry groups in Arizona are Mexican (25.8%), German (16.5%), English (10.3%), Irish (10.9%), and Native American (4.5%). The southern and central parts of the state are predominantly Mexican American, especially in Santa Cruz County and Yuma County near the Mexican border. The north-central and northwestern counties are largely inhabited by non-Hispanic White Americans. The northeastern part of Arizona has many American Indians. Asian Americans also made major contributions to the development of Arizona, such as the many Chinese who arrived in the state's mines and railroads, and the fact that over 20,000 Japanese Americans, mostly residing in the Grand Avenue section of Phoenix and farming areas of southern Arizona and the Colorado River valley, were interned during World War II. As of the 2010 US Census, Arizonans who claim Filipino ancestry exceed 53,000. Filipino Americans are also the largest Asian American subgroup in the state.

Arizona is projected to become a minority-majority state by the year 2027, if current population growth trends continue. In 2003, for the first time, there were slightly more births to Hispanics in the state than births to non-Hispanic whites. Since then, the gap has widened. In 2007, Hispanics accounted for 45% of all newborns, whereas non-Hispanic whites accounted for 41% of all births. All the other races accounted for 14% of births.

Birth data
Note: Births in the table don't add up, because Hispanics are counted both by their ethnicity and by their race, giving a higher overall number.

 Since 2016, data for births of White Hispanic origin are not collected, but included in one Hispanic group; persons of Hispanic origin may be of any race.

Languages 

As of 2010, 72.9% (4,215,749) of Arizona residents age 5 and older spoke English at home as a primary language, while 20.8% (1,202,638) spoke Spanish, 1.5% (85,602) Navajo, 0.4% (22,592) German, 0.4% (22,426) Chinese (which includes Mandarin), 0.3% (19,015) Tagalog, 0.3% (17,603) Vietnamese, 0.3% (15,707) other North American indigenous languages (especially indigenous languages of Arizona), and French was spoken as a main language by 0.3% (15,062) of the population over the age of five. In total, 27.1% (1,567,548) of Arizona's population age 5 and older spoke a mother language other than English.

Arizona is home to the largest number of speakers of Native American languages in the 48 contiguous states. Arizona's Apache County has the highest concentration of speakers of Native American Indian languages in the United States.

See also the list of native peoples. 
See also the list of Indigenous languages of Arizona.

Religion

According to the Association of Religion Data Archives, the fifteen largest denominations by number of adherents in 2010 and 2000 were:

Regarding non-Christian denominations, Hinduism became the largest non-Christian religion (when combining all denominations) in 2010, with over 32,000 adherents in several denominations, followed by Judaism with over 20,000 in three denominations, and Buddhism with over 19,000 adherents in several denominations.

Notes

References

External links 
 2000 Census of Population and Housing for Arizona, U.S. Census Bureau

 
Economy of Arizona
Arizona